Sart-Nauruzovo (Hart-Nawrıź) is a rural locality (a village) in Pribelsky Selsoviet, Karmaskalinsky District, Bashkortostan, Russia. The population was 404 as of 2010. There are 3 streets.

Geography 
Sart-Nauruzovo is located 27 km east of Karmaskaly (the district's administrative centre) by road. Pribelsky is the nearest rural locality.

References 

Rural localities in Karmaskalinsky District